Thór Vilhjálmsson (1930-2015) was an Icelandic jurist who served as judge and president of the Court of Justice of the European Free Trade Association States. Prior to his tenure on the EFTA Court, he served as a judge of the European Court of Human Rights, as an associate justice of the Supreme Court of Iceland, and as president of the Association of Icelandic Lawyers.

References

1930 births
2015 deaths
20th-century Icelandic judges
People from Reykjavík
21st-century Icelandic judges